Chetan (also known as Chasan, Chetīn, Chītan, Chīten, Chitin, and Chittin) is a village in Panjak-e Rastaq Rural District, Kojur District, Nowshahr County, Mazandaran Province, Iran. At the 2006 census, its population was 568 (134 families).

References 

Populated places in Nowshahr County